Jolimont and West Richmond was an electoral district of the Legislative Assembly in the Australian state of Victoria from 1889 to 1904. It was located in the inner eastern suburbs  of Melbourne and included parts of Richmond and Jolimont.

Its area was defined as: 

Jolimont and West Richmond was abolished in 1904 when several new districts, including the Electoral district of Abbotsford were created.

Members

Smith was earlier a member for Richmond from February 1883 to March 1889.

References

Former electoral districts of Victoria (Australia)
1889 establishments in Australia
1904 disestablishments in Australia